The Force of the Rally and the Alliance for Democracy is a political party in the French collectivité d'outre-mer of Mayotte. In the last elections for the General Council March 21 and 28 2004), the party won 6.5% of the popular vote, but no seats.

Political parties in Mayotte